Morikubo (written: 森久保) is a Japanese surname. Notable people with the surname include:

 (born 1974), Japanese voice actor, actor, and singer

See also
6643 Morikubo, main-belt asteroid

Japanese-language surnames